Magid, sometimes referred to as Magid Glove & Safety, is a manufacturer and distributor of personal protective equipment. The company reports it employs over 1300 workers worldwide in the production of industrial safety equipment by 2014. Magid consolidated its headquarters in Romeoville, Illinois in 2014, earning recognition for economic development and job creation  and ranking 170 out of 369 companies on Crain's List of Chicago's Largest Privately Held Companies

History 
Magid was founded in Chicago, Illinois in 1946 by Sam Magid, Abe Cohen, and Dave Cohen. The company started off only producing gloves and solely selling to wholesalers and distributors, but soon began expanding their product lines to sell directly to the end user. To accommodate the growing business, Magid added a manufacturing facility in the Philippines and a distribution center and sales office in Mexico. During the COVID-19 pandemic, the company volunteered to test disposable respirator masks against false promises of protection for first responders, health care workers, federal, state, and local municipalities, and companies seeking to protect their workers.

Notes 

Companies based in Will County, Illinois
Industrial supply companies
Romeoville, Illinois
Manufacturing companies established in 1946
Manufacturing companies of the United States
1946 establishments in Illinois